The Arabati Baba Tekḱe is a tekḱe located in Tetovo, North Macedonia. In 1799, a waqf provided by Recep Paşa established the current grounds of the tekke. The finest surviving Bektashi lodge in Europe, the sprawling complex features flowered lawns, prayer rooms, dining halls, lodgings and a great marble fountain inside a wooden pavilion.

Due to its striking architecture, the Arabati Baba Tekke has become an iconic symbol of Tetovo, and is featured on its municipal coat of arms.

History
Ali Baba was the brother-in-law of Sultan Suleiman the Magnificent, and had been a high-ranking Baba in the important Dimetoka Teḱe (now in Didymoteicho) when his sister (who was one of the sultan’s wives) fell into disfavour with her husband. As a result, Ali Baba was banished to Kalkandelen (present-day Tetovo) at the outer fringes of the Ottoman Empire where he started his own Teḱe.

Another version of the story goes that Ali Baba was an official of the Ottoman Empire who gave up his position in order to live the simple life of a Bektashi monk. Sultan Suleiman the Magnificent, angered by the departure of one of his favourite officials, yelled after Ali as he departed Istanbul, ‘‘If you will be a fool, then go.’’ Sersem, the old Turkish for ‘fool’, became Ali Baba’s nickname thereafter.

Whichever is the true story (the Turks favour the first one), Sersem travelled the vast empire of Turkey until he came upon the River Pena in the tranquil mountains of Tetovo. There he settled until his death in 1538, quietly practicing the way of the Bektashi order. After his death, his only pupil to survive him, Arabati Baba, founded a monastery in Tetovo to commemorate Sersem’s life.

The present-day buildings were built at the end of the 18th century by Rexhep Pasha, also a dervish, whose tomb lies next to Sersem’s in the teḱe mausoleum. Not all the buildings are still standing today; in the courtyard was originally built to house the sick daughter of Abdurrahman Pasha. The reception inn is still in disrepair, although the library is being refurbished.  One of the buildings has been turned into a Sunni mosque, but the inns around the Bektashi graveyard have been preserved for the Baba.

The Teke in Tetovo remained the seat of the Bektashi until 1912 when the Ottomans were driven out of Macedonia. Although the teḱe saw a small revival between 1941 and 1945, the lands were taken as state property during Yugoslav times and made into a hotel and museum.  In recent years, however, the Bektashi order has regained access to the teḱe and the site is being slowly refurbished. Although in considerable disrepair it is still the largest and most well-preserved teḱe in the western Balkans.

Arabati Baba controversy
In 2002, a group of armed members of the Islamic Community of Macedonia (ICM), the legally recognized organization which claims to represent all Muslims in Macedonia, invaded the Arabati Baba Tekke in an attempt to reclaim the tekke as a mosque, although the facility has never functioned as such. Subsequently the Bektashi community of Macedonia has sued the Macedonian government for failing to restore the tekke to the Bektashi community, pursuant to a law passed in the early 1990s returning property previously nationalised under the Yugoslav government. The law, however, deals with restitution to private citizens, rather than religious communities. The ICM claim to the tekke is based upon their contention to represent all Muslims in Macedonia; and indeed, they are one of two Muslim organizations recognized by the government, both Sunni. The (Shi'i) Bektashi community filed for recognition as a separate religious community with the Macedonian government in 1993, but the Macedonian government has refused to recognize them.

In March 2008, there were reports that the ICM members squatting on the facility grounds have taken control of additional buildings, have been intimidating visitors to the tekke, and have discharged their weapons on the grounds.

Images

See also
Dergah
Zawiyya
Alevi

External links
Free Sersem Ali: News on the Ongoing Controversy at the Harabati Baba Tekke
The Bektashi order of Sufis
A Visit to the Harabati Baba Tekke
Bektashi World Headquarters (in Albanian, English, Turkish)

Notes 

Bektashi tekkes
Islamic architecture
Religious buildings and structures in North Macedonia
Tetovo
Ottoman architecture in North Macedonia